Frank Sidney Chesterton FRICS (1877 – 11 November 1916) was an English architect.

Early life
He was born in 1877 in Kensington, London, the son of Sidney Rawlins Chesterton and Katherine Eleanor Chesterton. His first cousin was the author G. K. Chesterton.

Career
Chesterton designed the entire terrace of 12-54 Hornton Street, now Grade II listed, and built from 1903.

Chesterton served in the First World War, as a second lieutenant with the Royal Field Artillery, and died on 11 November 1916, aged 39, in the Battle of the Somme. He is buried at Grove Town Cemetery, Meaulte.

Personal life
Chesterton was married to Nora Chesterton, and they lived at 28 Warwick Gardens, Kensington, London, and later at Scarsdale Villas, Kensington.

He was the father of Sir Oliver Chesterton, fifth-generation head of the family's estate agency business, and chairman of the Woolwich Building Society.

References

1877 births
1916 deaths
Architects from London
British Army personnel of World War I
Royal Field Artillery officers
British military personnel killed in the Battle of the Somme
Military personnel from London